Hadriacus Mons is an ancient, low-relief volcanic mountain on the planet Mars, located in the southern hemisphere just northeast of the impact basin Hellas and southwest of the similar volcano Tyrrhenus Mons. Hadriacus Mons is in the Hellas quadrangle. The name was approved in 2007. The flanks of Hadriacus Mons have been eroded into gullies; its southern slopes are incised by the outflow channel Dao Vallis. The large extent of volcanic deposits and the caldera size leads some researchers to suggest that these features were the result of an explosive event caused by a contact between magma and groundwater.

It has been suggested that lava tubes at Hadriacus Mons could provide a location for a human habitat that would screen out harmful radiation.

See also

 List of mountains on Mars
 List of mountains on Mars by height
 Volcanoes on Mars

References

External links 

 Gazetteer of Planetary Nomenclature

Mountains on Mars
Hellas quadrangle
Volcanoes of Mars